James Capsey Karpoff (born October 14, 1937, in Smoky Lake, Alberta) is a former Canadian politician. Karpoff was a member of Parliament from 1988 to 1993, representing the riding of Surrey North in British Columbia.

He was first elected to Parliament for Surrey North in the 1988 election as a member of the New Democratic Party. He was defeated by Margaret Bridgman in 1993 and Chuck Cadman in 2004.

Before entering politics, Karpoff was an administrator and social worker.

References
 

1937 births
Living people
Members of the House of Commons of Canada from British Columbia
New Democratic Party MPs